Asgar may refer to:

 Ali Asgar (disambiguation)
 Asgar (stylist) (born 1955), celebrity hair stylist 
 Asgar Abdullayev (footballer) (born 1960), Azerbaijani retired footballer.
 Kami Asgar, Iranian-American Supervising Sound Editor. 
 Asgar Ali Karbalai, a political and social leader from Kargil District
 Asgar Khanlu
 Emamzadeh Asgar
 Khajeh Asgar
 Asgar Abade Kooh
 Asgar Khani
 Asgar, Bam
 Asgar, Rabor
 Deh-e Asgar
 Qal'eh-ye Asgar
 Boneh-ye Amir Asgar
 Chahardahi-ye Asgar
 Asgarabad (disambiguation)

See also 
 Ali al-Asghar ibn Husayn